Igor Alexandrovich Mirenkov (28 May 1969 – 19 June 1996), known as The Svietlahorsk Nightmare, was a Soviet-Belarusian serial killer who killed six boys aged 9–13 between 1990 and 1993.

Biography 
Igor Mirenkov was born on 28 May 1969 in the city of Svietlahorsk in the Byelorussian SSR, where he later lived out his life and committed all his crimes. After school, Mirenkov was called to serve in the Northern Fleet, where it was reported that he exhibited homosexual tendencies and solicited his colleagues. The investigator in the Mirenkov case, Oleg Litoshko, later stated that perhaps the sailors had raped him, which later led to Mirenkov's deformed mentality.

Returning to Svietlahorsk, Mirenkov got a job and bought a JAWA-brand motorcycle and began living a normal life. Mirenkov was absolutely imperceptible. Litoshko later said this:

Murder series 
The first murder Mirenkov committed was on 2 June 1990. His victim was a 13-year-old boy who was walking in the woods whom he attacked, raped, and killed with his knife. On 16 April 1991, he killed a 10-year-old boy under similar circumstances. At first, nobody made a connection to the killings, but Mirenkov decided to temporarily hide. For the whole of 1992, he did not commit a single murder due to being sentenced to three years of penal labour for robbery. Since Mirenkov was a model prisoner, he was often given a three-day leave, when he would commit his murders.

On 20 March 1993, Mirenkov committed a third murder, and on 30 March - a fourth. The city began to panic, the people started making adherents of the "White Вrotherhood", out of fear that Romani people or criminal gangs were kidnapping the children. During the summer of 1993, Mirenkov committed a further two murders, whose bodies were later found in a nearby forest in autumn. Parents took to the city of Svietlahorsk, organising pickets of the district administration, and creating self-defence committees.

Arrest, investigation and trial 
On 27 April 1994, Igor Mirenkov was arrested for stealing petrol and insurance fraud. He pleaded guilty and was imprisoned. On 14 May 1994, he was summoned for interrogation in the case of disappearances and murders of the children. He later confessed to six murders. The Belarusian authorities decided on unprecedented measures - the case was classified (and only declassified in 2007), and Mirenkov was put in solitary confinement in the city of Rechytsa, and investigative experiments were conducted within the framework of increased security measures for the defendant. The investigation lasted for more than a year, and after the criminal case was transferred to the Gomel Regional Court, Igor Alexandrovich Mirenkov was sentenced to death. On 19 June 1996, the verdict was carried out in the SIZO No. 1 Detention Unit in the city of Minsk.

See also 
 List of serial killers by country

References 

1969 births
1990 murders in Belarus 
1991 murders in Belarus 
1993 murders in Belarus
1996 deaths
Belarusian people convicted of murder
Executed Belarusian serial killers
Executed Soviet serial killers
Gay men
Male serial killers
People convicted of child sexual abuse
People convicted of murder by Belarus
People executed for murder
People from Svietlahorsk District
Soviet rapists
Violence against men in Europe